Yugoslavia was present at the Eurovision Song Contest 1988, held in Dublin, Ireland.

Before Eurovision

Jugovizija 1988 
The Yugoslav national final was held on 12 March 1988 at the Cankarjev dom in Ljubljana, hosted by Miša Molk and Bogdan Barovič. There were originally meant to be 16 songs competing, but "Noć u suzama" performed by Jasna Gospić had to be withdrawn as the singer was ill in hospital. The winning song was chosen by the votes of 8 regional juries.

The new voting system introduced in 1987 allowed the juries from each TV studio to be able to vote for their own entries.  Most of them used this opportunity, as well as in the following years. Every jury member (3 from every TV studio - 24 in total) could vote only for 5 songs.

At Eurovision 

On the night of the contest Yugoslavia performed last 21st, following Portugal. At the close of voting it had received 87 points, placing 6th in a field of 21.

Yugoslavia gave the decisive votes of the contest: it was the last country to vote, and at that point United Kingdom was leading Switzerland by five points at the top of the scoreboard. Yugoslavia began to award its points, and gave 6 points to Switzerland, edging it into a one-point lead over the UK. After earlier strong votes from most countries to the UK, it seemed highly likely that the UK would be given one of the higher remaining set of points. However as Yugoslavia announced its seven, eight, ten and twelve points, it transpired that it had awarded the UK no points at all, as the Yugoslav jury awarded its 12 points to France, and Switzerland was left with its one-point lead to savour a dramatic triumph.

Yugoslavia, as being the last jury to announce its votes, had caused the similar situation to happen when after their voting UK lost to Spain by 1 point in the 1968 Contest.

Voting

References

1988
Countries in the Eurovision Song Contest 1988
Eurovision